Top Cat is an American animated sitcom produced by Hanna-Barbera Productions and originally broadcast in prime time on the ABC network. It aired in a weekly evening time slot from September 27, 1961, to April 18, 1962, for a single season of 30 episodes. The show was a ratings failure in prime time, but became successful upon its time on Saturday morning television. The show also became very popular in Latin American countries (especially Mexico), and the United Kingdom.

History
Top Cat was created as a parody of The Phil Silvers Show with Arnold Stang imitating Sgt Bilko's voice for the titular character. Hanna-Barbera sold the cartoon to ABC based on a drawing of the main character. This was only the second cartoon series to premiere on prime time network television in the United States.

Premise
The title character, Top Cat (T.C.; voiced by Arnold Stang impersonating Phil Silvers) is the leader of a gang of Manhattan alley cats living in Hoagy's Alley: Fancy-Fancy, Spook, Benny the Ball, Brain, and Choo-Choo.

Top Cat and his gang were inspired by the East Side Kids, roguish, street-smart characters from a series of 1940s B movies, but their more immediate roots lay in The Phil Silvers Show (1955–59), a successful military comedy whose lead character (Sergeant Bilko, played by Silvers) was a fast-talking con artist. Maurice Gosfield, who played Private Duane Doberman in The Phil Silvers Show, provided the voice for Benny the Ball in Top Cat, and Benny's chubby appearance was based on Gosfield's. Additionally, Arnold Stang's vocal characterization was originally based on an impression of Phil Silvers's voice. During the original network run, the sponsor objected to the Silvers impersonation—insisting that he was buying Arnold Stang, not Phil Silvers—so in later episodes Stang modified the Top Cat voice, to a closer tone of his own voice.

The gang constantly hatch get-rich-quick schemes through scams but most of them usually backfire, and a frequent plot thread revolves around the local police officer, Charles "Charlie" Dibble (voiced by Allen Jenkins), ineffectually trying to either arrest them, evict them from the alley, get them to clean the alley, or stopping them using the policebox phone.

Like The Flintstones, all the episodes feature a cold open, which is a small scene from the episode that takes place in medias res, and after that, a long flashback that leads to the scene begins with the series' theme song "The Most Effectual Top Cat" and features Top Cat's misadventures that happen before the scene from the beginning plays. The story then continues from where it left off. In some episodes, the flashback stops near the middle when the same scene plays.

Broadcast
Top Cat aired on Wednesday nights in Prime Time from 8:30 to 9:00 pm. Hanna-Barbera created 30 half hour episodes of Top Cat. The show was broadcast in black and white but was created in color. The show aired on Saturdays in 1962 and 1963 on ABC, and was then rerun in various Saturday morning slots on NBC from 1965 to 1969, and occasionally in the 1980s.

Reruns of the series aired on Cartoon Network from 1992 until 2004, and on Boomerang from 2000 to 2014 and again from November 26 to November 29, 2020.

Analysis
Animation historian Christopher P. Lehman says that the series can be seen as social commentary. The cats may represent disenfranchised people confined to living in a poor environment. Top Cat's get-rich-quick schemes are efforts to escape to a better life. The gang faces a human police officer who frustrates their efforts and keeps them trapped in the alley. This enforcement of the social order by police ensures that the cats will not escape their current living conditions.

Co-creator Bill Hanna said it was one of the wittiest and most sophisticated shows he produced with a rare appeal to audiences of all ages.

Writing staff
Top Cat was conceived along the lines of a traditional, live-action situation comedy, and Hanna-Barbera recruited top sitcom writers of the day to furnish scripts, including Barry Blitzer (a Bilko veteran), Harvey Bullock, and Kin Platt. In the current DVD versions, however, only Platt gets writing credit due to a production error: the closing credits from Platt's episode were used for every episode, so Platt gets screen credit regardless of who wrote the actual scripts.

Characters

Episodes

Voice cast
Main voices:
 Arnold Stang as Top Cat
 Marvin Kaplan as Choo-Choo
 Maurice Gosfield as Benny the Ball
 Leo De Lyon as Brain, Spook
 John Stephenson as Fancy-Fancy
 Allen Jenkins as Officer Dibble

Additional voices:
 Bea Benaderet
 Herschel Bernardi
 Sallie Jones
 Don Messick
 Ge Ge Pearson
 Daws Butler
 Jean Vander Pyl
 Paul Frees
 Herb Vigran
 Walker Edmiston
 Hal Smith

Home media
Episodes of the series were released on VHS in Europe, as well as Worldvision Home Video in the United States.

The series' episode, "All That Jazz", was edited into a 7-minute preview as part of the "A Sample of Boomerang" tape, from Cartoon Network's sister channel, Boomerang.

Episodes of the series were also released on Laserdisc in the United Kingdom by Guild Home Video, as well as Image Entertainment in the United States.

Warner Home Video released Top Cat: The Complete Series on DVD in Region 1 on December 7, 2004, as part of their Hanna-Barbera Classic Collection. This set was re-released by Warner Archive on January 10, 2017, albeit as a manufacture-on-demand (MOD) release. On June 6 of that year, Top Cat was re-released in stores again as part of the Hanna-Barbera Diamond Collection in honor of Hanna-Barbera's 60th anniversary; however, all bonus features were removed.

In the UK, the complete series box set was released in 2007, initially as a HMV exclusive until 2008. Alternatively, five single DVD volumes, each containing 6 episodes, were released. The covers were originally from the US edition but later re-released with a new design. Each volume shows a group picture of Top Cat using Dibble's phone with his gang beside him, but the colour-coding is:
 Volume 1: Primrose (Episodes 1–6) – Top Cat
 Volume 2: Green (Episodes 7–12) – Choo-Choo
 Volume 3: Red (Episodes 13–18) – Fancy Fancy
 Volume 4: Blue (Episodes 19–24) – Benny
 Volume 5: Orange (Episodes 25–30) – Spook

The DVDs have since been made available to buy in other retailers across the UK.

In other media

Comic books
The gang's adventures continued off-screen in comic books as Dell (which became Gold Key) published 31 issues from 1961 to 1970. Charlton Comics published 20 more issues from 1970 to 1973. In Mexico, Ediciones Latinoamericanas' "La Colección Primavera" featured Don Gato in 1968.

In 2012, there was a crossover between Top Cat and Chilean comic book character Condorito.

Top Cat had a backup story in Adam Strange/Future Quest Annual #1 in where he escapes from prison and meets Batman through a cosmic portal. Unlike the cartoon, Top Cat is from a world where cats are the dominant species. As a follow-up, Top Cat also appears in one issue of a crossover series between DC and Hanna-Barbera, titled Superman/Top Cat Special (October 2018).

Books
Little Golden Books and Durabooks have both produced hardcover children's books starring Top Cat. In the UK, World Distributors published annuals during the 1960s sourced from the Dell comics strips. BrownWatson later published a 1978 annual entitled The Great Grape Ape and Boss Cat.

View-Master
T.C. and friends appeared on three View-Master reels in 1962. These were titled "Medal for Meddling", "Zoo-Operation", and "No Cat Fishing".

Music
The Original TV Soundtrack, written and recorded by Hoyt Curtin, was released by Colpix Records in 1962, consisting of slightly edited versions of "The Unscratchables" and "Top Cat Falls in Love". Hanna-Barbera Records released an LP in 1965 titled Robin Hood Starring Top Cat. T.C. and the gang were pictured as Merry Men on the cover. Its songs included "Top Cat", "M-O-N-E-Y", "Dibble", "Robin Hood", and "Buddies". It was re-released in 1977 on Columbia Records' Special Products label. A jazzy arrangement of the Top Cat theme can be heard most weeks over the end credits of Bob Dylan's Theme Time Radio Hour.

The titles and underscore were released as part of the CD release, The Best of Hanna-Barbera: Tunes from the Toons by Music Club in 2002 in Europe.

Top Cat's cameos

Other characters appearing in Top Cat
Other Hanna-Barbera characters make cameo appearances during the series.

 In the episode "King for a Day", Brain and Spook are reading comic books. Yogi Bear and Huckleberry Hound comics can be seen in the bottom right corner of the scene.
 In the episode "Rafeefleas", the gang is wandering through a museum at night when they come upon a group of statues labeled "Prehistoric Man". Choo-Choo insists that he's seen the figures before, maybe on TV, but T.C. waves this off. The statues are modeled after Fred Flintstone and Barney Rubble.
 In the episode "A Visit from Mother", "El Kabong" graffiti (Quick Draw McGraw's alter-ego) is seen on the wall in the background.

Top Cat's appearance in other shows
 Top Cat also made a cameo appearance in one of the What a Cartoon! shorts named "Buy One, Get One Free" in a party scene.
 Top Cat's theme is featured in The Flintstones episode "Surfin Fred" when Barney and Betty discover that Jimmy Darrock is in fact not a lifeguard.
 Officer Dibble makes a cameo appearance in The Flintstones episode "Time Machine", as a policeman in the future, thus returning the favor done in the episode "Rafeefleas" mentioned above.
 Top Cat and his gang appeared in Yogi's Ark Lark. While the others don't have dialogue, Top Cat was voiced by Daws Butler while Benny the Ball was voiced by John Stephenson. It was presumed that Arnold Stang wasn't available at the time while Maurice Gosfield was already dead in 1964.
 In 1985, Top Cat appeared on Yogi's Treasure Hunt with Yogi Bear and other Hanna-Barbera toon stars as the treasure hunt assigner. Officer Dibble made an appearance in the end of the show's episode, "Yogi's Beanstalk" voiced by John Stephenson since Allen Jenkins had died in 1974.
 In 1987, Hanna-Barbera produced a feature-length television film based on the show titled Top Cat and the Beverly Hills Cats (part of the Hanna-Barbera Superstars 10 film series), in which the gang helps a teenager claim her inheritance. During that time, John Stephenson reprised Officer Dibble while Benny the Ball was voiced by Avery Schreiber.
 Top Cat appears as a teenager in Yo Yogi! where he lives in a trash can at the mall. 
 In the Fender Bender 500 segment of Wake, Rattle, and Roll, Top Cat and Choo Choo were one of the racers driving a trash can-modeled monster truck called the Alley Cat.
 Top Cat was seen in a Cartoon Network Rap in 1995.
 In the Duck Dodgers episode "K-9 Quarry", Top Cat was amongst the poached Hanna-Barbera characters on the Alien Hunter's ship.
 Top Cat, Benny, Spook and Brain made a cameo appearance at the end of The Powerpuff Girls episode "Catastrophe". They can be seen at the bottom left corner of the screen (although, instead of his hat, Top Cat has a splat of slime on his head).
 Top Cat was seen briefly driving a motorcycle in the Foster's Home for Imaginary Friends episode "Cheese a Go-Go".
 Top Cat and the gang appear in a third-season episode of Harvey Birdman, Attorney at Law, "Mindless" where Birdman serves as Top Cat's attorney for charges of bookmaking and running an illegal gambling facility. In this appearance, Top Cat was voiced by Tom Kenny, while Benny the Ball was voiced by Maurice LaMarche. Top Cat also makes a cameo in the series finale when Birdman is forced to retry all his cases.
 Top Cat and Benny have a cameo in the Wacky Races episode "Off Track".
 Top Cat, Benny, and the rest of the alley cats appeared in the HBO Max original series Jellystone! Choo-Choo, Spook and Brain are females in this series. Spook is also renamed as Spooky and is completely silent.

Top Cat's appearances in comic strips
 Top Cat and his gang (except for Brain) appeared in the March 10, 2016 strip of Heathcliff.

Television specials
 Top Cat and the Beverly Hills Cats (1988)
 Hanna-Barbera's 50th: A Yabba Dabba Doo Celebration (1989)

Theatrical films
The series has spawned two theatrical films produced by Mexican animation studio, Ánima Estudios. Both films have grossed a combined total of $19.3 million (MX$166.35 million pesos).

 Top Cat: The Movie (2011)
 Top Cat Begins (2015)

Box office

International broadcast

Australia
The show premiered on the National Television Network (now known as the Nine Network) on October 5, 1962, and ran on the Nine Network until 1971.

Canada
Top Cat premiered on the CTV Television Network on October 9, 1961.

Hungary
Top Cat (Turpi úrfi) was one of the first American cartoons premiered on Hungarian television channels in 1969. It also broadcast later with The Huckleberry Hound Show, Tom and Jerry, Looney Tunes, The Flintstones and The Jetsons on Magyar Televízió from 1985 to 1990, and tv2 from 1997 to 1999 (together with Wacky Races, Scooby-Doo, Where Are You! and Scooby-Doo and Scrappy-Doo). Boomerang began broadcasting it in Hungarian in 2012.

Latin America
The show was dubbed to spanish in Mexico in 1963, using some of the same voice actors who worked in The Flintstones. It was renamed Don Gato y su pandilla (literally Mr. Cat and his gang) and the main characters adopted different accents. The voice acting improved the show, adding new jokes and local references.

In spite of the modest success of the show in the United States, the show was a massive hit in Mexico, Chile, Peru, Venezuela and Argentina, where it is recognized as one of the most famous Hanna Barbera characters ever, being as popular as The Flintstones. 

Besides Top Cat, all the other characters from the show were famous, and their popularity is commonly attributed by the excellent dubbing and voice acting: 
 Benny was renamed Benito B. Bodoque y B. and given a more childlike voice than was the case in the original dubbing.
 Choo Choo was renamed Cucho and spoke with Mexican-yucatan accent.
 Fancy-Fancy was Panza (belly).
 Spook renamed as the word's rough translation Espanto.
 Brain was called Demóstenes (honouring the Greek statesman Demosthenes, with whom he shares a speech impediment).
 Officer Charlie Dibble renamed as Oficial Carlos "Carlitos" Matute. 

The adaptation and translation was made by Rubén Arvizu. The main voice actors were Julio Lucena (voice of Top Cat), Jorge Arvizu (voice of Benny and Choo Choo), Víctor Alcocer (voice of Dibble), and David Reynoso, among others. Top Cat is still rerun every few years.

In Brazil, the character is known as Manda-Chuva (Brazilian Portuguese for big shot) and was voiced by actor Lima Duarte. In addition, the city of New York was replaced by Brasília (federal capital) in the Brazilian version.

India
Top Cat was one of the early favorites on Cartoon Network. It was aired in India in the 1990s. Top Cat was aired again in 2003 until 2004.

Japan
Top Cat (Japanese: ドラ猫大将) first aired on TV Asahi back in 1963 under the title translating to Stray Cat Boss. It was then rebroadcast many times over the years. In 1990, A new dub was produced for VHS sold by Columbia Records and released under its original name in Katakana (トップキャット). This new dub was also carried over to airing on Cartoon Network Japan since its launch in 1997.

Sri Lanka
Top Cat (Sinhala:  literally Crazy Cat) was one of the most popular cartoon shows in Sri Lanka early 1980s and it has been repeated several times on the national television channel "Rupavahini". The series is dubbed in Sinhala and directed by Titus Thotawatte.

United Kingdom

"Top Cat" premiered on the BBC Television Service (now BBC One) on May 16, 1962, under its original name but after only four weeks was renamed The Boss Cat on June 13, 1962. This was shortened on 22 February 1967 to Boss Cat. This rapid name change was made because Top Cat was also the name of a then-popular British brand of cat food, and the cartoon was aired on the BBC which does not carry advertising. The dialogue and theme tune still referred to the character by his original name, but a small cut was made at the climax of the opening credits (resulting in a slight jump in the film) and a title card carrying the revised title inserted before the episode proper. Similarly, the Top Cat name was edited from the final section of the show's closing credits, causing another slight jump (as Top Cat is putting on his eyeshades and readying himself for sleep in his trash can). The BBC run comprised only 26 of the original 30 episodes, with notable omissions including Choo-Choo Goes Ga-Ga, with its repeated scenes of Choo-Choo attempting suicide. This 26-episode selection was repeated on the BBC from 1962 to 1989.

Despite the show being renamed Boss Cat, the character's name was unchanged as Top Cat or the initials "TC". The Boss Cat title card was last used for a repeat run in 1989; by the time the series was next aired, in 1999, the Top Cat pet food brand had been discontinued in the United Kingdom, allowing the original US title sequence to be used. This continues to be the case in contemporary showings on satellite station Boomerang and BBC Two.

In 2016, the characters from the show (all the cats and Officer Dibble) were used as part of a set of television commercials for the British bank Halifax.

Name in different languages
 Brazilian Portuguese: Manda-Chuva (voice by Lima Duarte)
 British English: Boss Cat
 Bulgarian: Топ Кет (Top Ket)
 Canadian French: Top chatons
 Czech: Kočičí banda
 Danish: Top Kat
 Dutch: Top Kat
 English: Top Cat
 Finnish: Topi-katti ("Topi" does not mean 'Top', but is a Finnish nickname like "Tommy")
 French: Pacha
 German: Superkater
 Hungarian: Turpi úrfi (Lord Trick) in the series and Főmacsek (Main Cat) in the special.
 Italian: Top Cat
 Japanese:  (lit. 'Stray Cat Boss')
  (Tosho Machorot)
 Norwegian: Top Katt
 Persian: گربه استثنائی / داش پیشی / پیشی خان
 Polish: Kocia Ferajna (lit. Catfellas) and earlier translation Kot Tip Top (lit. Tip Top Cat)
 Portuguese: similar to Brazilian
 Romanian: Super Motanul
 Russian: ГлавКот
 
 Sinhala: 
 Spanish: Don Gato y su pandilla (Mr. Cat and his gang)
 Swedish: Top Cat (voice by Per Sandborgh)

See also

 List of works produced by Hanna-Barbera Productions
 List of Hanna-Barbera characters
 Top Cat and the Beverly Hills Cats
 Yogi's Treasure Hunt
 Jellystone!

Sources

References

External links

 
 
 
 

 
1960s American animated television series
1960s American sitcoms
1961 American television series debuts
1962 American television series endings
American animated sitcoms
American Broadcasting Company original programming
American children's animated comedy television series
American children's television sitcoms
Animated television series about cats
English-language television shows
Television characters introduced in 1961
Television series by Hanna-Barbera
Fictional portrayals of the New York City Police Department
Television series by Screen Gems
Television shows adapted into comics
Television shows set in New York City